Holthusen is a German surname. Notable people with the surname include:

Hans Egon Holthusen (1913–1997), German lyric poet, essayist, and literary scholar
Henry Frank Holthusen (1894–1971), American lawyer and diplomat
Mark Holthusen, American photographer

German-language surnames